Spiraeanthemum graeffei is a species of plant in the family Cunoniaceae. It is endemic to Fiji.

References

Endemic flora of Fiji
graeffei
Endangered plants
Taxonomy articles created by Polbot
Taxa named by Berthold Carl Seemann